German submarine U-12 was a Type IIB U-boat of Nazi Germany's Kriegsmarine laid down on 20 May 1935 by Germaniawerft at Kiel and commissioned on 30 September.

Design
German Type IIB submarines were enlarged versions of the original Type IIs. U-12 had a displacement of  when at the surface and  while submerged. She had two shafts and two  propellers.

U-12 was fitted with three  torpedo tubes at the bow, five torpedoes or up to twelve Type A torpedo mines, and a  anti-aircraft gun. The boat had a complement of twentyfive.

Fate
She was sunk 8 October 1939 by a mine, near Dover in the English Channel. All 27 of her crew died. The body of the commanding officer, Kapitänleutnant Dietrich von der Ropp, was washed ashore on the French coast near Dunkirk on 29 October 1939.

In 2002, the wreck was nominated by the German government to be designated as a protected place under the Protection of Military Remains Act 1986. This vessel was designated as a representative of all others lost within UK jurisdiction.

References

Bibliography

External links

 SI 2008/0950 Designation under the Protection of Military Remains Act 1986

German Type II submarines
U-boats commissioned in 1935
World War II submarines of Germany
World War II shipwrecks in the English Channel
Protected Wrecks of England
1935 ships
U-boats sunk in 1939
Ships built in Kiel
U-boats sunk by mines
Ships lost with all hands
Maritime incidents in October 1939
1939 in England